Clatter may refer to:

 Clatter, Powys, a village in Wales
 Clatter, or clitter, the blockfield strewn below the tors of Dartmoor
 Clatter, a brook in Clatterbridge, Wirral, England

See also 
 
 Klatter, a 2004 noise rock album
 Clutter (disambiguation)
 Clater, a surname